Parrhasia was a city of ancient Arcadia, in the region of Parrhasia. It was mentioned by Homer in the Catalogue of Ships in the Iliad. It was said to have been founded by Parrhasus, a son of Lycaon, or by Pelasgus, son of Arestor. Some writers equate the city with Lycosura.

References

Populated places in ancient Arcadia
Former populated places in Greece
Lost ancient cities and towns
Locations in the Iliad